Łazienkowska Thoroughfare (also translated as Łazienkowska Road, Łazienkowska Street, Łazienkowska Freeway, Łazienkowska Highway and Łazienkowska Tract) is a road in Warsaw, Poland. It connects the center of Warsaw with the east-bank of Warsaw. It was built from 1971 to 1974.

The road is an important part of the east-west transportation infrastructure of Warsaw. It is classified as a class GP road ("fast traffic road") and has two or three lanes of traffic in each direction.

The name of the road refers to Łazienki Park and Łazienki Palace, located to the south-west of the Łazienkowski Bridge.

The name "Łazienkowska Street" may refer also to the road linking the Czerniakowska Street with the Rozbrat Street, where the Polish Army Stadium and the Arena COS Torwar are located.

History
The oldest plans for the route date to the 1930s. It was built in the years 1971–74 in the People's Republic of Poland, during the era of Edward Gierek. It was opened on 22 July 1974, on the 30th anniversary of the People's Republic. The construction was one of three major infrastructure projects in Warsaw (the two others being the Warszawa Centralna railway station and Wisłostrada route). It was extended in the 1990s. It has been subject to various major repairs over its history; the most recent one in preparation for the UEFA 2012 (the route was part of the main transportation route between the Okęcie Airport and the Stadion Narodowy).

The original plans for the road were to service 5,000 cars per hour; currently it serves over 7,000.

Location
The road is a key element in the east-west transportation infrastructure of Warsaw. It connects the center of Warsaw (Ochota and Śródmieście) with the eastern side of the river (Praga Południe).

The road is classified as a "fast traffic road" (GP) in Poland, with two to three lanes of traffic in each direction. Until the end of 2013, most of the route was the part of the National road 2.

Łazienkowski Bridge (formerly the Zygmunt Berling Bridge) over the River Vistula is part of the route.

In popular culture
The route was popularized in the 1970s Polish TV series Czterdziestolatek, and a 2012 article in Polish daily Gazeta Wyborcza noted that thanks to the popularity of the show, it is most likely the "most famous road in Poland".

See also

References

External links

Streets in Warsaw
Fast traffic roads in Warsaw
Roads in Poland